Malcolm Roy Clarke  (24 October 1930 – 10 May 2013) was a British marine biologist. He is most well known for his extensive work on cephalopods and whales.

Career
Clarke did his National Service in the Royal Army Medical Corps from 1948 to 1950.

He founded the Cephalopod International Advisory Council, serving time its Secretary and President.

Awards and honours
Clarke was elected a Fellow of the Royal Society in 1981. The deep-sea anglerfish Oneirodes clarkei Swinney & Pietsch, 1988 was named in his honor.

Personal life
Clarke married Dorothy Clara Knight in 1958 and had three sons and one daughter together.

References

1930 births
2013 deaths
Marine zoologists
Teuthologists
British marine biologists
British zoologists
Fellows of the Royal Society